Johannes Frederik "Joop" Hiele (born 25 December 1958 in Rotterdam) is a former football goalkeeper from the Netherlands, who earned seven caps for the Netherlands national football team. He was a member of the Dutch team that won the European title at the 1988 European Football Championship in West Germany, but was second choice behind Hans van Breukelen.

Player career 
Hiele started his professional career with Feyenoord Rotterdam (1977–90), then moved to SVV (1990–92), Dordrecht'90 (1992–94) and ended his career at Go Ahead Eagles (1994–95).

Manager career 
Later on, Hiele became a goalkeeping coach and worked for Willem II and PSV Eindhoven.

Hiele became a general football coach for the first time at ASWH, where he was a goalkeeping coach in 2012–2015 and for a while in 2015 general caretaker. Hiele continued to general coaching for VV Zwaluwen, XerxesDZB, and SV Heienoord.

References

External links
 

1958 births
Living people
Dutch footballers
Association football goalkeepers
Feyenoord players
Go Ahead Eagles players
SV SVV players
FC Dordrecht players
Netherlands international footballers
Eredivisie players
1990 FIFA World Cup players
UEFA Euro 1988 players
UEFA European Championship-winning players
Footballers from Rotterdam
ASWH managers
Dutch football managers
VV Zwaluwen managers
Association football goalkeeping coaches
Willem II (football club) non-playing staff